The geniculate river snail or ornate rocksnail, scientific name Lithasia geniculata, is a species of freshwater snails with an operculum, aquatic gastropod mollusks in the family Pleuroceridae. This species is endemic to the United States.

References

Molluscs of the United States
Pleuroceridae
Gastropods described in 1840
Taxa named by Samuel Stehman Haldeman
Taxonomy articles created by Polbot